East Home Avenue Historic District is a national historic district located at Hartsville, Darlington County, South Carolina.  The district encompasses 52 contributing buildings and 1 contributing site in a primarily residential section of Hartsville. They were constructed between about 1890 to about 1938, and is associated with the leading figures of the town's history. Home Avenue has historically been the major residential street in Hartsville since it was laid out and landscaped in 1890. Architectural styles and influences include Renaissance Revival, Colonial Revival, Classical Revival, American Craftsman, and Bungalow.  Notable non-residential buildings include the First Baptist Church, Thornwell Elementary School, and Hartsville Public School.  Located in the district is the separately listed John L. Hart House.

It was listed on the National Register of Historic Places in 1991.

References

External links
 

Historic districts on the National Register of Historic Places in South Carolina
Renaissance Revival architecture in South Carolina
Colonial Revival architecture in South Carolina
Neoclassical architecture in South Carolina
Historic districts in Darlington County, South Carolina
National Register of Historic Places in Darlington County, South Carolina
Houses in Hartsville, South Carolina